Samuel Bassetti (born April 2, 1991 in Santa Rosa, California) is an American cyclist, who currently rides for UCI Continental team .

Major results
2017
 Tour of Poyang Lake
1st Stages 2, 8 & 11
2018
 1st Winston Salem Cycling Classic
 1st Points classification Joe Martin Stage Race
 1st Stage 3 Redlands Bicycle Classic
 1st Stage 3 San Dimas Stage Race
 1st Stage 1 Tulsa Tough
 3rd National Criterium Championships
2019
 1st Overall Tulsa Tough
1st Stage 3
 1st White Spot / Delta Road Race

References

External links

1991 births
Living people
American male cyclists
Sportspeople from Santa Rosa, California
Cyclists from California